Sengoku 3 is a 2001 side-scrolling beat 'em up arcade video game developed by Noise Factory and published by SNK. It is the third and final entry in the Sengoku series. In the game, players battle against undead enemy spirits. Though initially launched for the Neo Geo MVS (arcade), the title was later released to Neo Geo AES (home), in addition of being re-released through download services for various consoles. It was met with positive reception from critics and reviewers since its initial release.

Gameplay 

As with previous Sengoku titles, Sengoku 3 is a side-scrolling beat 'em up game where players take control of one of the four initial playable characters with two more characters being unlocked during gameplay across various stages filled with an assortment of undead evil spirits.

Development and release 
Sengoku 3 was developed by Noise Factory and was first released for arcades on July 18, 2001. The soundtrack was composed by Toshikazu Tanaka, who was previously employed at SNK and worked on project such as Fatal Fury: King of Fighters. Tanaka stated in an interview that his biggest challenge when composing for the project was getting the music quality nearly up to levels of other games at the time. Tanaka decided on using streaming playback for the music, as he felt he could not guarantee the high quality he desired with previous methods. The sound driver used was not designed with streaming in mind, proving difficult for Tanaka to do so and he considered modify the sound driver himself but could not make it so due to time schedule. However, Tanaka was able to do the work by himself.

Sengoku 3 was later released for the Neo Geo AES system on October 25, 2001. The North American AES release has since become one of the more expensive titles on the platform, with copies fetching over US$2200 on the secondary video game collecting market. In 2013, Sengoku 3 was digitally re-released for the Japanese Wii Virtual Console service, courtesy of D4 Enterprise. Sengoku 3 is included in the Neo Geo 25th Anniversary Humble Bundle, released in 2015. Hamster Corporation re-released Sengoku 3 for the Xbox One, PlayStation 4, and Nintendo Switch in 2018 under their Arcade Archives series.

Reception 

Sengoku 3 has been met with positive reception from critics and reviewers alike since its release. Both Kyo and Ben of French magazine HardCore Gamers noted the improved visuals over its predecessors and regarded it to be an "excellent" beat 'em up game.

In 2014, HobbyConsolas identified Sengoku 3 as one of the twenty best games for the Neo Geo AES.

In 2023, Time Extension included the game on their top 25 "Best Beat 'Em Ups of All Time" list.

Notes

References

External links 
 
 Sengoku 3 at GameFAQs
 Sengoku 3 at Killer List of Videogames
 Sengoku 3 at MobyGames

2001 video games
ACA Neo Geo games
Arcade video games
SNK beat 'em ups
Cooperative video games
D4 Enterprise games
Hack and slash games
Multiplayer and single-player video games
Neo Geo games
Nintendo Switch games
PlayStation Network games
PlayStation 4 games
Side-scrolling beat 'em ups
SNK Playmore games
Virtual Console games
Video game sequels
Windows games
Xbox One games
Video games developed in Japan
Hamster Corporation games